Mangora spiculata is a species of orb weaver in the family Araneidae. It is found in North America.

References

Further reading

 
 
 
 
 
 
 

Araneidae
Spiders described in 1847